Princess Eileen of Wied, Hereditary Princess of Albania (2 September 1922 – 1 September 1985), was an Englishwoman who became the wife of Carol Victor, Hereditary Prince of Albania. She is known in Albanian as (Albanian: Princesha trashëgimtare e Shqipërisë).

Princess Eileen was born in Chester, England. She was the daughter of George Johnston, a landscape gardener, and his wife, Alice (née Percival).

Marriages and death
She was married twice, being widowed on both occasions. Her first marriage was to Swiss-American Captain André de Coppet (1892 - 1953), DSC, late of the US army on 6 November 1943 in New York City. They had no children. In 1953, Eileen was widowed for the first time when André died in Lausanne, Switzerland, on 1 August 1953.

She married Carol Victor on 8 September 1966 in New York City. They later moved to England, and lived in Cheyne Walk, Chelsea, London. In 1973, Eileen was widowed for a second time when Carol Victor died at Munich, Bavaria, on 8 December 1973 (buried Neuwied am Rhein). The house became extinct on his death as he had no children, and no arrangements had been put in place for a successor.
 
Princess Eileen died in New York on 1 September 1985.

Notes and sources

Genealogisches Handbuch des Adels, Fürstliche Häuser, Reference: 1991 2

1922 births
1985 deaths
People from Chester
House of Wied-Neuwied
Albanian nobility
Albanian royalty
20th-century English people
British expatriates in the United States